Stager or Stagers may refer to:

People
Anson Stager (1825–1885), co-founder of Western Union
Barbara Stager (born 1948), American murderer
Gus Stager (born 1920s), American swimming coach
Kenneth E. Stager (1915–2009), American ornithologist
Lawrence Stager (1943–2017), American archaeologist

Other uses
Stager, someone who works to improve the appeal of real estate for sale
Stager, Michigan, an unincorporated community in Iron County
The Stagers, a television show
Old Stagers, an English theatre company